Dejan Radić (born 8 July 1980) is a Serbian former professional footballer who played as a goalkeeper.

Club career
From 1999 to 2003, Radić played for Rad in the First League of Serbia and Montenegro, before the club suffered relegation to the Second League. He later moved abroad to Russia and joined Alania Vladikavkaz in early 2004. In his two seasons at the club, Radić made 38 league appearances in the top flight, before the side got relegated at the end of the 2005 season. He later signed with fellow Russian club Spartak Nalchik, spending three seasons (2007–2009) and making 43 league appearances. In January 2010, Radić was acquired by Rostov.

Career-ending injury
On 23 April 2011, during a Russian Premier League game between Rostov and Terek Grozny, Radić collided with Zaur Sadayev while fighting for a high ball. As a result, Radić had to be rushed to the hospital and had to undergo nephrectomy after his kidney was found to be seriously damaged. Following the incident, Rostov announced that Radić would continue to receive all the bonuses during the time of his recovery. However, despite Rostov's initial promises, Radić stopped being paid by the club and did not receive any money stipulated in his contract between June 2011 and March 2012. Meanwhile, it was reported that Terek president Ramzan Kadyrov gave Radić $50,000 as a goodwill gesture.

International career
In December 2000, Radić earned one cap for FR Yugoslavia at under-21 level, coming on as a substitute for Zoran Vasković in a 2–1 friendly win away against Greece.

References

External links

 
 
 

Association football goalkeepers
Expatriate footballers in Russia
FC Rostov players
FC Spartak Vladikavkaz players
First League of Serbia and Montenegro players
FK Rad players
Footballers from Belgrade
PFC Spartak Nalchik players
Russian Premier League players
Serbia and Montenegro expatriate footballers
Serbia and Montenegro expatriate sportspeople in Russia
Serbia and Montenegro footballers
Serbia and Montenegro under-21 international footballers
Serbian expatriate footballers
Serbian expatriate sportspeople in Russia
Serbian footballers
1980 births
Living people